Jennifer S. Clarvoe is an American poet and English professor at Kenyon College. She has published two books of poetry, Invisible Tender and Counter-Amores. She won the Kate Tufts Discovery Award in 2001.

Education and career
Clarvoe received her B.A. from Princeton University in 1983. She earned her Ph.D. from the University of California at Berkeley in 1993.

She has taught at Harvard Summer School, Wellesley College, Boston University, and in the MFA Program at the University of California at Irvine.

She has taught English at Kenyon College in Ohio since 1990.

Her work has appeared in The Antioch Review, AGNI, The Yale Review, Partisan Review, and The Ohio Review.

Clarvoe published her first collection of poetry, Invisible Tender, in 2000. Essayist Jane Satterfield wrote that her lines were "[e]dgy as often as lyrical, formal as they are free (Clarvoe relishes, for instance, variations on the sestina)." Poet Laura Sims wrote in the Boston Review that Clarvoe's "vision of progression, tied up with childhood memories and marked by the 'fall' into adulthood, is highly personalized. The early poems of Invisible Tender serve as close studies of childhood events; their glance is backward, but the past is reclaimed in new form, allowing forward movement. These poems also acknowledge loss (of memory, of family ties, etc.), and in the course of each poem these losses are transformed into gifts, albeit imperfect ones." The collection earned her the Kate Tufts Discovery Award in 2001.
 
In 2011 she published her second book of poetry, Counter-Amores. Each of the poems in the collection is a reversal of Ovid's elegies from Amores.

Awards
 2002-2003 Rome Prize in Literature by the American Academy of Arts and Letters, which allowed her to spend the year writing at the American Academy in Rome.
 Poets Out Loud Prize, for Invisible Tender
 2001 Kate Tufts Discovery Award, for Invisible Tender

Works

Poetry
 
 
 
Counter-Amores. Chicago : The University of Chicago Press, 2011. ,

References

Year of birth missing (living people)
Living people
21st-century American poets
American women poets
Boston University faculty
Harvard Summer School instructors
Kenyon College faculty
Princeton University alumni
University of California, Berkeley alumni
University of California, Irvine faculty
Wellesley College faculty
21st-century American women writers
American women academics